The Daihatsu Delta also known as the DAIHATSU Delta Truck is an automotive nameplate that has been used on a variety of Japanese Daihatsu trucks and vans between 1970 and 2010. They have usually been Toyota-based, or otherwise based on models from the Toyota-owned Hino Motors. The trucks have utilized a cab over engine or mid-engine design. Typically fitted with Toyota engines, a few versions, particularly diesels, received Daihatsu's own engines. The Delta badge was retired in Japan in 2003, but continued to be used on models built locally in other markets until 2010.

Medium-duty truck 

Set to replace the old Daihatsu V series cab over medium trucks, between October 1970 and 2003 (2010 outside Japan), Daihatsu retailed the Delta and Delta 1500/2000—a rebadged Toyota Dyna. Five generations were constructed, with new models released in 1977, 1984, 1995 and 1999.

While the third generation Delta finished production for the Japanese market in 1995, it continued in production until 2006 for many markets, including South America, Australia and New Zealand.

Light-duty truck 

Following the medium-duty trucks were the light-duty Delta 750 trucks released in March 1971 (D10 series)—rebadged Toyota LiteAce trucks. Second generation versions arrived in October 1979 (D20 series), surviving until October 1982.

Van 

Daihatsu released a cargo van and passenger wagon model named Delta Wide Van/Wagon in November 1976 (B10 series)—a rebadged Toyota TownAce. The second generation (B20 series) was released in November 1982 and was rebodied for January 1992, maintaining existing mechanicals. Third generation models (R40/R50 series) arrived in October 1996—now badged Delta Van/Wagon and continued on until November 2001.

Delta
Delta
Cab over vehicles
Vans
Vehicles introduced in 1970